Wyspa Piasek (Sand Island) in Wrocław, is one of several islands in the Odra river within old town and Śródmiejski Węzeł Wodny (Downtown Water Junction). With the left bank of Oder river and old town of Wrocław Wyspa Piasek is connected by a Piaskowy Bridge, and with Ostrów Tumski by Tumski Bridge.

The island has an area of about 5 hectares. Only one street runs across the island (St. Jadwiga street, between Piaskowy Bridge and Młyńskie Bridges). On the island is one of several Biblioteka Uniwersytecka (University Library) building (former Augustinian monastery), an old gothic Church of Saint Anna (in 1810 rebuilt to hospital and next to residential building), a baroque Church of Saints Cyril and Methodius (in 1810 here was transferred the church of Saint Anna) and the watermill Maria. In the old days Wyspa Piasek was densely built-up, however during the last month of the Second World War many of these buildings were destroyed.

See also
 Church of St Mary on the Sand
 St. Cyril and Methodius Church (Wrocław)

External links

Districts of Wrocław
River islands of Europe
Islands of Poland